Wang Mo (pinyin: Wáng Mó; Wade-Giles: Wang Mo) (born 1895) was a politician and educator in the Republic of China. He was an important politician during the Wang Jingwei regime (Republic of China-Nanjing). He was born in Yilong, Sichuan.

Biography
Wang Mo went to Japan where he graduated the Tokyo Teacher's High School (Now, the Tokyo University of Education) and the Tokyo Imperial University. Later he returned to China, he successively held the positions of Professor of the National University of Wuchang, National University of Beiping, Teacher's College and Tsinghua University. And he was also elected to Senator of the Beijing Government. Later he worked as president of the National Teacher's University of Beiping, from 1942, he also worked for the professor this University.

In November 1943, upon the North China Political Council was reformed, Wang Mo was catapulted to Chief of the General Office for Education and Executive Member of the same Council. In next July, he resigned his post.

After that the whereabouts of Wang Mo were unknown.

Alma mater
University of TsukubaUniversity of Tokyo

References

Politicians from Nanchong
Republic of China politicians from Sichuan
Educators from Sichuan
Chinese collaborators with Imperial Japan
1895 births
Year of death uncertain
Peking University alumni
Academic staff of Tsinghua University